Raven Baxter (also known as Raven the Science Maven) is an American science communicator, molecular biologist, and STEM educator. She is recognized in Fortune magazine's "40 Under 40 in Health" list for 2021, and Forbes 30 Under 30 for 2022.

Education 
Raven attended Williamsville North High School where she competed as a track and field athlete in long jump, triple jump, discus, and sprinting.

Baxter completed Bachelor's (2014) and master's (2016) degrees in biology at Buffalo State College, where she researched protein folding in Caenorhabditis elegans. In 2021, she earned her Ph.D. in curriculum, instruction, and the science of learning at University at Buffalo's Graduate School of Education, and was awarded the Arturo Alfonso Schomburg fellowship for her Ph.D. program.

Career 

While pursuing her master's degree, Baxter worked as a substitute teacher in Buffalo Public Schools. She went on to work at AMRI Global in drug discovery following her Master's program. Baxter also taught as an assistant professor of biology at Erie Community College, an experience which she says changed her career path. While completing her Ph.D. program, Baxter worked as an academic adviser at Buffalo State.

Baxter was an invited speaker at TEDxGreatMills in September 2020, where she discussed her experiences as a Black woman working as a corporate research scientist.

Baxter partnered with the National Center for Science Education (NCSE) during Earth Week 2021 to create a series of videos to educate students about climate change.

Baxter was invited to give the opening keynote at SciComm2020 and has been published in Mother Jones. She was selected as a Distinguished Lecturer for the RTI Fellows Program in 2021.

Baxter launched Smarty Pants Clothing in January 2021. Smarty Pants features STEM-themed apparel and accessories. Ten percent of sales goes toward college scholarships.

Following her tweet floating an idea for a Dirty Jobs spin-off called "Nerdy Jobs", Baxter was contacted by science communicator and Crash Course host Hank Green with an offer to fund a pilot.

Baxter uses her social media platform to counter misinformation around COVID-19 and vaccines. In response to one controversial tweet made by Nicki Minaj on side effects of vaccines, Baxter shared a rap song she made on how vaccines work. "Vaccines are significantly proving to be saving lives, the more the people who get them, the better it is for us all, she said.

Recognition 

In 2020, Baxter was recognized as one of Fortune's "40 under 40 in Health".

In 2021, Baxter was the winner of the SUNY Chancellor's Award for Student Excellence - Special Service: COVID-19. She was also featured on the cover of issue #8 of Reinvented Magazine.

In 2022, Baxter was recognized as one of Forbes's "30 Under 30" for her viral raps and science communication.

Music 

In 2017, Baxter began publishing science education videos under the moniker "Raven the Science Maven." Her popularity expanded after releasing "Big Ole Geeks," a parody of Megan Thee Stallion's hit "Big Ole Freak." "Wipe It Down," Baxter's parody of Lil Boosie's "Wipe Me Down," contained information and safety tips related to the COVID-19 pandemic, and received nearly 27,000 views in its first three months. Baxter released a remix of Megan Thee Stallion's song "Body" titled "Antibodyody", which explains how the body makes antibodies to fight disease, written to help one of Baxter's former students prepare for an exam.

Baxter released an updated version of “The Antibody Song” to the tune of rapper Megan Thee Stallion’s “Body,” a hit that resonated with many pandemic-weary listeners and inspired multiple trends on TikTok. Baxter’s song went viral, teaching nearly three million listeners across several platforms about B cells, macrophages and opsonization.

References

External links
Official website

Buffalo State College alumni
Science communicators
American Internet celebrities
Living people
Year of birth missing (living people)
21st-century African-American women
21st-century African-American people
African-American rappers